George Kane may refer to:

 George Proctor Kane (1820–1878), mayor of Baltimore, Maryland, 1877–1878
 George Kane (American football) (1891–1969), American football player
 George Kane (director), Irish film and television director

See also
 George Cain (1943–2010), author
 George Caines (1771–1825), first official reporter of cases in the United States
 George Cane, diver, see Great Britain at the 1908 Summer Olympics